Guillermo Nicolás Pfund (born 30 May 1989) is an Argentine professional footballer who plays as a centre-back for Club Olimpo.

Career
Pfund began in the youth of Unión de Tornquist, Boca Juniors and Vélez Sarsfield. In 2010, Deportivo Merlo of Primera B Nacional loaned Pfund. He was sent off on both his debut versus San Martín in February and his final appearance versus Boca Unidos in May. June 2011 saw Pfund join Peru's Cienciano on loan, though he'd return to Vélez Sarsfield months later to subsequently be loaned out to Swiss Challenge League side Bellinzona. He appeared nine times in tier two, six of which were as a starter for them. A second loan with Deportivo Merlo was completed on 17 July 2012. Twenty-three appearances came.

Pfund completed a move to Luis Ángel Firpo of the Primera División El Salvador in 2014. He made appearances in fixtures with Santa Tecla, Isidro Metapán, Atlético Marte, UES and Dragón as they were relegated. Brown became Pfund's sixth senior club in mid-2014. His first goal arrived in his second season versus Deportivo Español in March 2015, which was one of three in a campaign which concluded with promotion. In total, Pfund scored five in ninety-four in three years. After spending 2017–18 with Barracas Central, where he received his seventh career red card, Pfund signed for Comunicaciones in July 2018.

Career statistics
.

Honours
Brown
Primera B Metropolitana: 2015

References

External links

1989 births
Living people
Sportspeople from Buenos Aires Province
Argentine footballers
Association football defenders
Argentine expatriate footballers
Expatriate footballers in Peru
Expatriate footballers in Switzerland
Expatriate footballers in El Salvador
Argentine expatriate sportspeople in Peru
Argentine expatriate sportspeople in Switzerland
Argentine expatriate sportspeople in El Salvador
Primera Nacional players
Swiss Challenge League players
Primera División de Fútbol Profesional players
Primera B Metropolitana players
Club Atlético Vélez Sarsfield footballers
Deportivo Merlo footballers
Cienciano footballers
AC Bellinzona players
C.D. Luis Ángel Firpo footballers
Club Atlético Brown footballers
Barracas Central players
Club Comunicaciones footballers
Olimpo footballers